Jasov Cave (and ) is a speleothem limestone cave and archaeological site in the Slovak Karst in Slovakia.

History
The cave was partly opened for the public in 1846, making it the oldest publicly accessible cave in Slovakia.

Many archaeological discoveries of the Paleolithic, Neolith and the Hallstatt periods have been made in the cave. Along with a number of caves of the Slovak Karst, Jasov Cave has been induced into the UNESCO World Heritage list as a part of the Caves of Aggtelek Karst and Slovak Karst site.

See also
 List of caves in Slovakia

References

External links
  Jasov Cave at  
 Jasov Cave on the Slovak Caves Administration page 

Show caves in Slovakia
World Heritage Sites in Slovakia
Geography of Košice Region
Tourist attractions in Košice Region
Archaeological sites in Slovakia
Caves of Aggtelek Karst and Slovak Karst
Paleolithic sites